"Hello Trouble" is a song written by Orville Couch and Eddie McDuff and was recorded by Couch in 1962. Couch's version made number 5 on the country charts that year, via Vee-Jay Records.

Buck Owens and the Buckaroos also covered the song on the album Together Again, released in 1964.  This version was later included on the soundtrack to Crazy Heart in 2009.

LaWanda Lindsey covered the song in 1974 for Capitol Records. Her version charted at number 62.

It was then recorded by American country music group The Desert Rose Band and released in July 1989 as the fourth and final single from the album, Running.  The song reached #11 on both the Billboard Hot Country Singles & Tracks chart and the Canadian RPM Country Tracks chart.  The Desert Rose Band version features Herb Pedersen on lead vocals.

Chart performance

Orville Couch

LaWanda Lindsey

The Desert Rose Band

References

1962 singles
1974 singles
1989 singles
Orville Couch songs
Buck Owens songs
LaWanda Lindsey songs
The Desert Rose Band songs
Song recordings produced by Paul Worley
Vee-Jay Records singles
Capitol Records singles
MCA Records singles
Curb Records singles
1962 songs